İncekum Nature Park is a nature park in Turkey. Its distance to Alanya is  

The nature Park consists of two sections. The first section was a picnic area and the second section was the training center of the Ministry of Forestry. In 2003 they were combined and in 2006 they were declared a nature park.

The flora of the park consists of palm tree, oleander, acacia, laurus, sandalwood and oak.

References

Nature parks in Turkey
Beaches of Turkey
2006 establishments in Turkey
Alanya District
Tourist attractions in Antalya Province
Protected areas established in 2006